Paul Maurer (born 22 May 1996) is a German footballer who plays as a right winger.

Career
Maurer made his professional debut for Energie Cottbus in the 3. Liga on 9 May 2015, coming on as a substitute in the 76th minute for Nikolas Ledgerwood in the 0–3 home loss against Borussia Dortmund II.

References

External links
 Profile at DFB.de
 
 Profile at fcenergie-museum.de
 

1996 births
Living people
People from Bernau bei Berlin
Footballers from Brandenburg
German footballers
Association football wingers
FC Energie Cottbus II players
FC Energie Cottbus players
1. FC Lokomotive Leipzig players
1. FC Köln II players
FSV Union Fürstenwalde players
VSG Altglienicke players
3. Liga players
Regionalliga players